Jiří Zeman (born February 12, 1982) is a Czech professional ice hockey defenceman. He played with HC Litvínov in the Czech Extraliga during the 2012–13 Czech Extraliga season.

Career statistics

References

External links

Living people
1982 births
BK Mladá Boleslav players
Czech ice hockey defencemen
HC Berounští Medvědi players
HC Litvínov players
HC Most players
HC Slovan Ústečtí Lvi players
LHK Jestřábi Prostějov players
Rytíři Kladno players
People from Vsetín
Sportspeople from the Zlín Region